Black Friday (1916) was October 20, the day a "perfect storm" hit Lake Erie, sinking four large ships, killing forty-nine people.

The ships that were dispatched to the depths by the violent weather were the James B. Colgate, Marshall F. Butters, D.L. Filer and the Mérida.

In the western part of the lake, "the convergence of two high pressure systems and a minor hurricane" created the devastating force that day.

Individual ships

The whaleback freighter James B. Colgate was sailing to Thunder Bay when it sank around 10 P.P. near Blenheim, Ontario. The ship's captain was the only survivor. The wreck has been located on the lake bed.

The wooden-hulled  lumber-carrier Marshall F. Butters out of Midland, Ontario sank near the Detroit River. The crew of thirteen was rescued by two nearby ships. In the years since, the wreck has been located.
  One of the survivors, the second engineer, Herman Schmock, left a detailed account of the sinking and the rescue.

The 45 year old schooner D.L. Filer also sank near the mouth of the Detroit River, with only the captain being rescued, and then not until the next day. The wreck has yet to be located.

The Merida was a Canadian steamer. None of the twenty-three crew members survived, though their bodies were recovered, floating in their life vests. The wreck has been located.

References

1916 meteorology
1916 in Ontario
Lake Erie
1916 natural disasters
1916 disasters in Canada